Cyathostemon is a genus of flowering plants in the myrtle family, Myrtaceae. The genus is endemic to southwestern Western Australia. The genus was first described by Nikolai Turczaninow in 1852.
Species include:
Cyathostemon ambiguus (F.Muell.) Rye & Trudgen
Cyathostemon blackettii (F.Muell.) Rye & Trudgen
Cyathostemon divaricatus Rye & Trudgen
Cyathostemon gracilis Rye & Trudgen
Cyathostemon heterantherus (C.A.Gardner) Rye & Trudgen
Cyathostemon sp. Dowak
Cyathostemon sp. Lake King
Cyathostemon sp. Red Roo Rock
Cyathostemon sp. Salmon Gums
Cyathostemon tenuifolius  Turcz.
Cyathostemon verrucosus Rye & Trudgen

References

 
Myrtaceae genera
Taxa named by Nikolai Turczaninow
Plants described in 1852
Endemic flora of Southwest Australia